"MotorSport" is a song by American hip-hop trio Migos with fellow rappers Nicki Minaj and Cardi B. It was released on October 27, 2017, as the lead single from the trio's third studio album Culture II (2018). It was produced by Murda Beatz and Cubeatz, and the producers wrote it with the artists. It reached number six on the US Billboard Hot 100, becoming Migos' second top 10 in the country.

Background and release 
"MotorSport" marks the first time Migos, Minaj, and Cardi B have worked together on a song; although Offset had already collaborated with Minaj on London on da Track's "No Flag", and with Cardi B on her own track "Lick". On October 25, 2017, radio station Hot 93.7 confirmed that a collaboration between Migos, Minaj, and Cardi B would be released two days later. On October 26, the night before its release, Migos previewed the track on Power 105.1's music celebration, Powerhouse. On October 27, the song premiered online and was released worldwide as a download. Soon after it was released, Joe Budden from Everyday Struggle speculated that Ye was originally on the song and that he's the one who actually pitched the idea of getting Minaj on it. It was also rumored that Cardi B and Minaj were dissing each other on the song, which both rappers denied. Minaj commented on the rumors saying that the song was originally only a collaboration between her and Quavo, that she was "in full support of Cardi B's 'MotorSport' feature" and that "the conspiracy theorists are just so tired", while Cardi B said that "people wouldn't be satisfied even if [we] was making out" and "I don't really have the time".

Composition 
The song references celebrities such as Criss Angel, Bill Belichick, Boosie, Jackie Chan, Yo Gotti, Selena, Britney Spears, Vince Lombardi, Mike Tyson, Lucy and Ricky Ricardo and Lil Uzi Vert; and brands such as Bugatti, Chanel, Givenchy, Lamborghini, McDonald's, Xanax, Percocet, Porsche, Richard Mille, Patek Philippe, Audemars Piguet and Saks, among others. Cardi B also references Daddy Yankee's 2004 song "Gasolina".

Critical reception 
Minaj and Cardi B's verses received positive reviews. Editors from Billboard noted Cardi B's line "trap Selena" as an "ambitious statement." Minaj's verse on the song was listed by Angel Diaz of Complex as the "Best Rap Verse of the Month" of October 2017. For another Complex writer, both rappers have "standout moments." Cardi B's verse won Best Featured Verse at the 2018 BET Hip Hop Awards.

Music video 
Directed by Migos member Quavo and directors Bradley & Pablo, the music video was released on December 6, 2017, on Apple Music. It was made available on YouTube the next day.

Commercial performance
The song reached number six on the US Billboard Hot 100, becoming Migos' second top 10 in the country. Cardi B won a BET Hip Hop Award for Best Featured Verse for the song, even though she is credited as a lead artist on it. It was also nominated for a BET Award for Viewers' Choice.

Live performance
Cardi B included "MotorSport" on her medley performance at the 2018 iHeartRadio Music Awards. She also performed the song as a special guest on the Aubrey & the Three Migos Tour on August 25, 2018.

Minaj performed the song during her Rolling Loud festival performance on May 13, 2018, in Miami.

Track listing

7-inch vinyl
 "MotorSport"
 "MotorSport"

Charts

Weekly charts

Year-end charts

Certifications

Release history

References

External links 
 

2017 songs
2017 singles
Migos songs
Nicki Minaj songs
Cardi B songs
Songs written by Quavo
Songs written by Offset (rapper)
Songs written by Nicki Minaj
Songs written by Cardi B
Songs written by Murda Beatz
Songs written by Kevin Gomringer
Songs written by Tim Gomringer
Song recordings produced by Murda Beatz
Song recordings produced by Cubeatz
Capitol Records singles
Motown singles